Recent clubs that have participated in the Tonga Major League include:
 Lotohaʻapai United
 Haʻamoko United Youth
 Marist Prems
 Popua
 Kolofoʻou No.1
 Veitongo FC
 Ngeleʻia FC

Tonga
 
Football clubs
Football clubs